Cory Daniel Edwards (born September 12, 1991), better known as Lil Cory is an Actor and rapper from Salem, Alabama.

Early life

Edwards is from the Echota Cherokee Tribe and grew up in Salem, Alabama. His father, Winfred Wilson Bynum played American football for the New York Giants.

Career
He was discovered by multi-platinum Grammy Award winning producer Jared Gosselin. He has made appearances on several television shows including Star Trek: Picard.

Discography

Singles

Filmography

See also

 List of Epic Records artists
 Music of Atlanta

References

Living people
Epic Records artists
Musicians from Atlanta
1988 births